Paweł Tarło (died 1565) was a Polish noble.

Tarło was canon of Kraków, dean of Przemyśl and Archbishop of Lwów from 1561 (then in the Kingdom of Poland, now Lviv in Ukraine).

References 

16th-century births
1565 deaths
16th-century Roman Catholic archbishops in the Polish–Lithuanian Commonwealth
Pawel
Archbishops of Lviv
Canons of Kraków